Constitutional Assembly elections were held in the Kingdom of Serbs, Croats and Slovenes on 28 November 1920. The Democratic Party emerged as the largest faction, winning 92 of the 419 seats. Deputies are elected by secret ballot, in a direct manner, by the electoral quotient system. The 1920 elections were the first democratic elections in the Kingdom of Serbs, Croats and Slovenes. Shortly after the election, the Communist Party of Yugoslavia was banned by the authorities.

Background
Up until the elections a Provisional Assembly had existed of unelected delegates from each of the constituent regions of the country.

Electoral districts
The electoral districts corresponded to administrative divisions of the constitutive lands which came together to form the Kingdom in late 1918. There were 56 in total:

Parties

There were a total of 22 party lists and one independent list.

Croatian Husbandmen's Party (Hrvatska težačka stranka, HTS) - Croatian nationalist political party in Bosnia and Herzegovina formed in 1919. Its leader Jozo Sunarić had been a leading member of the Croat People's Union in the former Diet of Bosnia.
Croatian Popular Party (Hrvatska pučka stranka, HPS) - Political party formed in 1919 associated with the Croatian Catholic movement. It ran candidates in districts in Bosnia and Herzegovina, Croatia-Slavonia, Dalmatia, and Vojvodina.
Independent Agrarian Party (Samostojna kmetijska stranka, SKS) - Slovenian anti-clerical political party founded in June 1919 in Ljubljana.
People's Radical Party (Narodna radikalna stranka, NRS) - Formed in Serbia in 1881, the People's Radical Party had formed the government of the Kingdom of Serbia since 1909 and its party leader Nikola Pašić became the first prime minister of the Kingdom of Serbs, Croats and Slovenes in 1918. Džemijet entered a coalition with the People's Radical Party and won six deputies.
Yugoslav Democratic Party (Jugoslovenska demokratska stranka, JDS) - Formed by former members of the Croat-Serb Coalition in Austria-Hungary led by Croatian Serb Svetozar Pribićević and opposition politicians in Serbia led by Ljubomir Davidović in February 1919. The party advocated a centralized state and the abolishment of regional autonomy.

Results

References

External links
Nebojša A. Popović, Srpske parlamentarne stranke u Kraljevini SHS 1918-1929
Branko Petranović, Momčilo Zečević, Jugoslavija 1918-1988. Tematska zbirka dokumenata, p. 158

Yugoslavia
Constitutional Assembly election
Elections in Yugoslavia
November 1920 events
Election and referendum articles with incomplete results